Vijay Singla is an Indian politician and the MLA representing the Mansa Assembly constituency in the Punjab Legislative Assembly. He was the Minister of Health and Family welfare and Medical education, Govt of Punjab between March–May 2022. He is a member of the Aam Aadmi Party. 

He was one of 3 ministers under AAP govt arrested in corruption. He was elected as the MLA in the 2022 Punjab Legislative Assembly election.

Career

Member of Legislative Assembly
Singla was elected as the MLA in the 2022 Punjab Legislative Assembly election.  He represented the Mansa Assembly constituency in the Punjab Legislative Assembly. The Aam Aadmi Party gained a strong 79% majority in the sixteenth Punjab Legislative Assembly by winning 92 out of 117 seats in the 2022 Punjab Legislative Assembly election. MP Bhagwant Mann was sworn in as Chief Minister on 16 March 2022.

Cabinet minister
Singla took oath as a cabinet minister along with nine other MLAs on 19 March at Guru Nanak Dev auditorium of Punjab Raj Bhavan in Chandigarh. Eight ministers including Singla who took oath were greenhorn (first term) MLAs.

As a cabinet minister in the Mann ministry, Singla was given the charge of two departments of the Punjab Government:
 Department of Health and Family Welfare
 Department of Medical Education and Research

On May 24, 2022, Chief Minister Bhagwant Mann removed Singla from the cabinet ministry after charges of corruption against him came up to the notice of CM. Punjab Police was ordered by the CM to investigate the case. He was arrested by the Punjab Police. An employee of the Punjab Health System Corporation had complained against Singla and his assistant. Mohali court has sent Singla on 14 day judicial custody till the next hearing on 10 June.

Electoral performance

References

 

Living people
Punjab, India MLAs 2022–2027
Aam Aadmi Party politicians from Punjab, India
Year of birth missing (living people)
People from Mansa district, India
Mann ministry